Claudius Hollyband (born Claude de Sainliens; Latin: Claudius a Sancto Vinculo) was a 16th-century French-English linguist, philologist, phonologist, lexicographer and instructor of English, French, Italian and Latin. He was the author of many books and treatises regarding language, including one of the earliest French-English dictionaries, A Dictionarie French and English, published in London in 1593.

A Huguenot refugee from Moulins where he was born in 1534, France, Hollyband arrived in London, England in about 1564 and died in this city in 1594.

Works 
 The French school-master, 1573, réimp. Menston, Scolar Press, 1972, 1573
 De Pronuntiatione linguae gallicae (1580) : suivi de The French Littleton (1566), réimp. Genève, Slatkine Reprints, 1973
 Claudii a Sancto Vinculo De pronuntiatione linguae gallicae libri duo, London, Scolar Press, 1974
 Campo di Fior, or the Flowery Field of Four Languages (1583)
 A Dictionarie French and English : published for the benefite of the studious in that language, London, Thomas Woodcock, 1593 ; réimp. London, Scolar Press, 1974
 The French schoolemaister. Wherein is most plainly shewed the true and perfect way of pronouncinge the French tongue to the furtherance of those who desire to learn it, London, Clement Knight, 1612 ; réimp. London, Scolar Press, 1974
 The Elizabethan home, Folcroft, Folcroft Library, 1974
 The French Littelton: A most easie, perfect, and absolute way to learne the Frenche tongue, London, Scolar Press, 1974
 Claude Desainliens, de pronuntiatione lingua Gallicae, 1580, Menston, 1970
 The Pretie and Wittie Historie of Arnalt & Lucenda : translated from B. Maraffi's Italian version of the Greek original, together with the Italian version with certen Rules and Dialogues set foorth for the learner of th' Italian tong... by C. Hollyband, London, Thomas Purfoote, 1575
 A Treatise for declining of verbes, which may be called the second chiefest worke of the French tongue, London, G. Miller, 1633

Bibliography 
 Laurent Berec, Claude de Sainliens, un huguenot bourbonnais au temps de Shakespeare, Éditions Orizons, 2012
  Antonio Amato, Teoria e pratica glottodidattica nell'opera di Claudius Holyband (alias Claude de Sainliens), Roma, Bulzoni, 1983
 Jean-Marie Gaul, Commentaire du French Littelton (1576) de Claude de Sainliens, Montréal, Université de Montréal, 1960
 Peter Rickard, La Langue française au seizième siècle. Étude suivie de textes, Cambridge, Cambridge University Press, 1968
 R. C. Simonini, Jr., Italian Scholarship in Renaissance England. Chapel Hill, University of North Carolina Press, 1952

References

Sources 
 Lucy E. Farrer, Un devancier de Cotgrave : la vie et les œuvres de Claude de Sainliens alias Claudius Holyband, Paris, H. Champion, 1908 ; réimp. Genève, Slatkine Reprints, 1971
 Vera Ethel Smalley, The Sources of A dictionarie of the French and English tongues by Randle Cotgrave (London, 1611); a study in Renaissance lexicography, Baltimore, Johns Hopkins Press, 1948, (p. 71–88)
 Laurent Berec, Claude de Sainliens, un huguenot bourbonnais au temps de Shakespeare, Éditions Orizons, Paris, 2012

16th-century English educators
Huguenots
Linguists from England
Grammarians from France
English philologists
Linguists from France
French lexicographers
French philologists
Writers  from Moulins, Allier
1534 births
1594 deaths